Bangladesh Chemical Industries Corporation College, BCIC College, is a private higher secondary educational institution in Dhaka, Bangladesh. It is situated near the National Zoo of Bangladesh.  Bangladesh Chemical Industries Corporation operates the institution. The intelligence officer of the Bangladesh Army manages this institution. It is a coeducation institution having different shifts for girls and boys. The institution is a double shift(morning and day) institution with over 2000 students.

The institution has two separate campuses for each school and college. Both campuses are situated beside each other and operated by one chief principal. The school section has 1200 students, offering education from first to tenth grade. The college section offers eleventh-grade and twelfth-grade standards of education, having 900 students in total from Science, Commerce, and Humanities subjects.

History
BCIC college commenced its journey with the school section in 1983. The Science Group, the Business Studies Group and the Humanities Group of the college section started their operations in 1991, 1996 and 1997 respectively.

Co-curricular activities
BCIC College has many success in co-curricular activities. The college has won prizes in different categories in the competitions of National Education Week, EEE Day, 1st National Television Debate, Math Olympiad and Science project including Victory Flower.

 Sports
 Cultural Activities
 Bangladesh Scouts

There is also 4 House system such as: 1.Shahjalal House, 2.Karnaphuli House, 3.Ashuganj House, 4.Jamuna House.

References

External links
 

Colleges in Dhaka District
Universities and colleges in Dhaka
1983 establishments in Bangladesh